What Went Wrong?: The Clash Between Islam and Modernity in the Middle East  is a book by Bernard Lewis released in January 2002, shortly after the September 11 terrorist attack, but written shortly before. The nucleus of this book appeared as an article published in The Atlantic Monthly in January 2002.

The book's thesis is that throughout recent history, specifically beginning with the failure of the second Ottoman siege of Vienna in 1683, the Islamic world has failed to modernize or to keep pace with the Western world in a variety of respects, and that this failure has been seen by many within the Islamic world as having allowed Western powers to acquire a disastrous position of dominance over those regions.

See also 
 Islam and modernity

References

External links
The original article (Abstract plus first two paragraphs)
Description by the Oxford University Press
What Is Wrong with What Went Wrong? by Adam Sabra, associate professor of Middle East history at the University of Georgia
 Book review by M. Shahid Alam, professor of economics at Northeastern University (A more complete version of this essay, with footnotes and references, has appeared in Studies in Contemporary Islam 4 (2002), 1:51-78)
 Ismail Küpeli: Was ging schief beim 'Untergang des Morgenlandes'? Eine exemplarische Sichtung der Geschichtsdarstellung von Bernard Lewis. München, 2007,  (Critical book about "What Went Wrong" in German)
Booknotes interview with Lewis on What Went Wrong?, December 30, 2001.

Books by Bernard Lewis
2002 non-fiction books
History books about Islam
The Atlantic (magazine) articles